The 1993 Rugby League Premiership was the 19th end-of-season Rugby League Premiership competition.

The winners were St Helens.

First round

Semi-finals

Final

References

Rugby League Premiership